Ward Badr Abdulrida Salim (وارد بدر عبدالرضا سالم; born 1 July 1956), is an Iraqi author, novelist, and journalist born in Basrah; he received a technical diploma from the Institute of Applied Arts. He is active in Iraqi journalism, and was editor-in-chief of Al Taliaah literature magazine for young authors. He also worked in Al Aqlam and Asfar magazines. 

He managed the cultural section for both Women Today (المرأة اليوم) Emirati magazine and AlBayan newspaper. He went back to Iraq in 2008 and worked as executive sub-editor in Baghdadi newspaper AlMada, and editor-in-chief of Al Sabah alJadeed newspaper. 

Salim has published a number of notable works including novels, short story collections, texts, and op-eds, in addition to winning several awards. 

In 2018, it was reported that Salim was arrested by Emirati authorities after he received an invitation to attend Al Owais Cultural Award ceremony in the UAE. According to these reports, the reason for arrest and what was coming next for him was unclear. 

The Iraqi Ministry of Culture would follow up for updates with Salim’s case communicating with UAE Ambassador, praying that Salim gets released.

Career and notable works 
Salim published a number of notable works, including (The Wonders of Baghdad) and (Asabeh El Sard أصابع السرد),  Due to his interest in travel literature, Salim published (Hindus Knocking the Door of the Sky) in 2010, along with texts that included (Lovers Guide) in 2015.

List of publications

Awards 
Salim has won a number of literary awards, including Dubai’s first prize for short story in 2007, for his short story collection (The American Bar), and Ibn Batutta Prize for travel literature in Abu Dhabi.

Reviews 
Fawzia Al Jaberi and Doaa Al Azoz said that the author, in his novels, tends to use settings that carry a realistic element, where he describes the scene in details that make it similar to reality as accurate as possible.

References 

1956 births
Living people
Iraqi writers